Deloyala is a genus of tortoise beetles in the family Chrysomelidae. There are about 10 described species in Deloyala.

Species
 Deloyala barberi (Spaeth, 1936)
 Deloyala camagueyana (Zayas, 1989)
 Deloyala cruciata (Linnaeus, 1758)
 Deloyala fuliginosa (Olivier, 1790)
 Deloyala guttata (Olivier, 1790) (mottled tortoise beetle)
 Deloyala insubida (Boheman, 1855)
 Deloyala lecontei (Crotch, 1873)
 Deloyala lecontii
 Deloyala trilineata Spaeth, 1936
 Deloyala zetterstedti (Boheman, 1855)

References

Further reading

 Arnett, R. H. Jr., M. C. Thomas, P. E. Skelley and J. H. Frank. (eds.). (21 June 2002). American Beetles, Volume II: Polyphaga: Scarabaeoidea through Curculionoidea. CRC Press LLC, Boca Raton, Florida .
 Arnett, Ross H. (2000). American Insects: A Handbook of the Insects of America North of Mexico. CRC Press.
 Borowiec, Lech (1999). A world catalogue of the Cassidinae (Coleoptera: Chrysomelidae), 476.
 Dejean, P.F.M.A. (1836). Catalogue des coléoptères de la collection de M. le comte Dejean (2nd edition, 1833–1836, fasc. 5), 361–443.
 Madge, R. B. (1988). "The publication dates of Dejean's catalogues". Archives of Natural History, vol. 15, part 3, 317–321.
 Richard E. White. (1983). Peterson Field Guides: Beetles. Houghton Mifflin Company.
 Riley, Edward G., Shawn M. Clark, and Terry N. Seeno (2003). "Catalog of the leaf beetles of America north of Mexico (Coleoptera: Megalopodidae, Orsodacnidae and Chrysomelidae, excluding Bruchinae)". Coleopterists Society Special Publication no. 1, 290.
 White, Richard E. (1968). A Review of the Genus Cryptocephalus in America North of Mexico. Smithsonian Institution Press.

Cassidinae